Cossé-en-Champagne is a commune in the Mayenne department in north-western France.

Sights 
Its church, called Notre-Dame, is known for its Romanesque frescoes, some dating from the 15th century, and is listed as a historic monument in France.

See also
Communes of the Mayenne department

References

Cosseenchampagne